Teen Ghumti is a Nepali novel by Bishweshwar Prasad Koirala. It was published in 1968 by Sajha Prakashan. It is Koirala's second novel and fourth book. Koirala was the first elected prime minister of Nepal. He was prisoned multiple time during his political life and used to write in the prison. He wrote this book while he was imprisoned in January 1964.

Koirala is considered the master of psychological fiction in Nepali literature. His novels and stories usually features a prominent and strong female character.

Synopsis 
It is set during the Panchayat regime in Nepal. Indramaya, a Newa girl falls in love with Pitamber, who belongs to Brahmin family. Amidst the difficulties of taboo regarding inter-caste marriage in Nepal, they get married. For his political activism, Pitamber is jailed by the Panchayat government. During his imprisonment, Indramaya falls for his friend Ramesh and gets pregnant. The novel depicts the psychological struggle of Indramaya.

Adaptation 
The book was adapted into a 2016 film of the same name. It was directed by Babu Ram Dhakal. Garima Panta played the role of Indramaya and Dhurba Dutta and Sushant Karki played the role of Pitamber and Ramesh respectively.

See also 

 Sumnima
 Narendra Dai
 Modiaain

References 

20th-century Nepalese books
20th-century Nepalese novels
Nepalese novels
Cultural depictions of Nepalese women
1968 Nepalese novels
Works by Bishweshwar Prasad Koirala
Nepali-language novels
Novels set in Nepal
Nepalese novels adapted into films
Novels set in Kathmandu